Yury Afanasenko (born 19 August 1973) is a Belarusian professional football coach and a former player. As a player, he played for Dinamo Minsk, Dinamo Brest, Alania Vladikavkaz, Belshina Bobruisk, and Gomel.

Career

After leaving Dinamo Minsk, Afanasenko signed for Alania in Russia. However, despite signing a three-year contract, he was released after six games.

Honours
Dinamo Minsk
 Belarusian Premier League champion: 1992–93, 1993–94, 1994–95, 1995.
 Belarusian Cup winner: 1994.

Gomel
 Belarusian Premier League champion: 2003.

References

External links

Yury Afanasenko at teams.by

1973 births
Living people
People from Babruysk
Soviet footballers
Belarusian footballers
Belarus international footballers
Belarusian expatriate footballers
Expatriate footballers in Russia
Association football goalkeepers
Russian Premier League players
Belarusian Premier League players
FC Dynamo Brest players
FC Dinamo Minsk players
FC Spartak Vladikavkaz players
FC Gomel players
FC Dinamo-93 Minsk players
FC Belshina Bobruisk players
Sportspeople from Mogilev Region